Santa María del Real is a municipality in the Honduran department of Olancho.

Demographics
At the time of the 2013 Honduras census, Santa María del Real municipality had a population of 10,636. Of these, 87.83% were Mestizo, 8.17% White, 2.18% Black or Afro-Honduran, 1.81% Indigenous (1.09% Chʼortiʼ, 0.39% Lenca) and 0.01% others.

References

Municipalities of the Olancho Department